Narh may refer to:

 Alexander Narh Tettey-Enyo (born 1940), Ghanaian educationist
 Moses Narh (born 1986), Ghanaian-Nigerien football midfielder